Spišská Nová Ves railway station serves the town and municipality of Spišská Nová Ves, in the Košice Region, eastern Slovakia.

Opened in 1871, the station is a junction between the Košice–Žilina railway, which is part of Slovakia's main east–west rail corridor, and a  spur line to Levoča.

The station is currently owned by Železnice Slovenskej republiky (ŽSR); train services are operated by Železničná spoločnosť Slovensko (ZSSK).

Location
Spišská Nová Ves railway station is situated at J. Fabiniho, northwest of the town centre.

History

The station was opened on 12 December 1871, upon the inauguration of the Poprad–Spišská Nová Ves section of the Košice–Bohumín Railway.

Soon afterwards, on 12 March 1872, the next section of that railway was completed, between Spišská Nová Ves and Kysak.

The spur line to Levoča was opened on 8 November 1892.

Regular passenger services on the spur line were suspended in February 2003, despite protests from residents and local officials, especially in Levoča. Only a handful of Marian pilgrim trains have operated as passenger trains on the line since then, but freight traffic has continued.

On 1 April 2010, a locomotive ran into a stationary passenger train at the station after its brakes failed during a test ride, killing three people and seriously injuring eight others.

Facilities
The double storey station building houses information and ticketing facilities, and a restaurant.

The station yard has tracks equipped with low level platforms for passenger services and tracks for freight workings.

Train services
Spišská Nová Ves railway station is the junction of the following Slovakian railway lines:

180 Košice–Žilina (part of the Košice–Bohumín Railway)
186 Spišská Nová Ves–Levoča

Line 180 forms part of Pan-European Corridor Va, which runs from Venice in Italy to Kyiv in Ukraine, via Bratislava, Žilina, Košice and Uzhhorod.

Interchange
The station provides interchange with local buses.

Services

See also

History of rail transport in Slovakia
Rail transport in Slovakia

References

Notes

Further reading

External links

 Spišská Nová Ves railway station on vlaky.net 

Spiš
Railway stations in Košice Region
Railway stations opened in 1871
Railway stations in Slovakia opened in the 19th century